German submarine U-666 was a Type VIIC U-boat built for Nazi Germany's Kriegsmarine for service during World War II.
She was laid down on 16 September 1941 by Deutsche Werft, Hamburg as yard number 815, launched on 18 July 1942 and commissioned on 26 August 1942 under Kapitänleutnant Herbert Engel. Oberleutnant zur See Ernst Wilberg took over command on 10 December 1943.

Design
German Type VIIC submarines were preceded by the shorter Type VIIB submarines. U-666 had a displacement of  when at the surface and  while submerged. She had two shafts and two  propellers.

U-666 was fitted with five  torpedo tubes (four fitted at the bow and one at the stern), fourteen torpedoes, one  SK C/35 naval gun, 220 rounds, and two twin  C/30 anti-aircraft guns. The boat had a complement of between forty-four and sixty.

Service history
The boat's career began with training at 5th U-boat Flotilla on 26 August 1942, followed by active service on 1 March 1943 as part of the 6th Flotilla for the remainder of her service.

Convoy SC 122
On 19 March 1943, after damaging the Greek freighter Carras, a B-17 Flying Fortress bomber from No. 220 Squadron RAF hit the boat with four depth charges, causing sufficient damage as to force her to return to France.

Wolfpacks
U-666 took part in 14 wolfpacks, namely:
 Ostmark (6 – 11 March 1943)
 Stürmer (11 – 20 March 1943)
 Seewolf (21 – 30 March 1943)
 Oder (17 – 19 May 1943)
 Mosel (19 – 24 May 1943)
 Trutz (1 – 16 June 1943)
 Trutz 2 (16 – 29 June 1943)
 Leuthen (15 – 24 September 1943)
 Rossbach (24 September – 6 October 1943)
 Hela (28 December 1943 – 1 January 1944)
 Rügen 6 (5 – 7 January 1944)
 Rügen (7 – 26 January 1944)
 Stürmer (26 January – 3 February 1944)
 Igel 1 (3 – 10 February 1944)

Fate
U-666 was sunk on 10 February 1944 in the North Atlantic west of Ireland, in position 53.56N, 17.16W, by depth charges from a Swordfish aircraft (842 Sqn FAA/A) of the British escort carrier HMS Fencer. 51 dead (all hands lost).

Summary of raiding history

See also
 Convoy SC 122

References

Notes

Citations

Bibliography

External links

German Type VIIC submarines
1942 ships
U-boats commissioned in 1942
Ships lost with all hands
U-boats sunk in 1944
World War II shipwrecks in the Atlantic Ocean
World War II submarines of Germany
Ships built in Hamburg
Maritime incidents in February 1944